Župčany is a village and municipality in Prešov District in the Prešov Region of eastern Slovakia.

History
In historical records the village was first mentioned in 1248.

Geography
The municipality lies at an altitude of 322 metres and covers an area of   (2020-06-30/-07-01).

Population 
It has a population of 1,799 people (2020-12-31).

References

Villages and municipalities in Prešov District
Šariš